Ramashankar Rajbhar  is an Indian politician and is Member of Parliament of the 15th Lok Sabha of India. He represents the Salempur constituency of Uttar Pradesh and is a member of the Samajwadi Party political party.

Early life and education
Ramashankar Rajbhar was born in Shivpur, Deoria district in the state of Uttar Pradesh. He is a graduate from the Gorakhpur University.

Political career
Ramashankar Rajbhar is a first time MP. He succeeded Hari Kewal Prasad who was four times MP from the same constituency. Hari Kewal Prasad was a member of the 9th, 10th, 12th and 14th Lok Sabhas and belonged to Samajwadi Party.

Posts held

See also

15th Lok Sabha
Politics of India
Parliament of India
Government of India
Bahujan Samaj Party
Salempur (Lok Sabha constituency)

References 

India MPs 2009–2014
1960 births
Bahujan Samaj Party politicians from Uttar Pradesh
Lok Sabha members from Uttar Pradesh
People from Deoria, Uttar Pradesh
People from Deoria district
Living people
People from Ballia